Tejsingh Sendhav is an Indian politician. He was elected to the Madhya Pradesh Legislative Assembly from the Hatpipliya Assembly constituency for four terms.

Political career
Tejsingh ran for the Hatpipliya Assembly constituency seat 6 times and won four of those times.

References

|-

|-

Madhya Pradesh MLAs 1977–1980
Madhya Pradesh MLAs 1980–1985
Madhya Pradesh MLAs 1990–1992
Madhya Pradesh MLAs 1998–2003
Bharatiya Janata Party politicians from Madhya Pradesh
Living people
People from Dewas
People from Dewas district
1946 births